Aznavleh (also Romanized as Aznāvleh and Aznāvaleh; also known as Aznarāleh and Aznazāleh) is a village in Yeylaq Rural District, in the Central District of Buin va Miandasht County, Isfahan Province, Iran. At the 2006 census, its population was 640, in 125 families.

References 

Populated places in Buin va Miandasht County